Huilongguan Subdistrict is a subdistrict situated within the 6th Ring Road and Changping District, Beijing, China. It borders Shigezhuang, Longzeyuan and Huoying Subdistricts in its north, Xisanqi Subdistrict in its east and south, Dongsheng Town and Qinghe Subdistrict in its south, and Xibeiwang Town in its west. Its total population was 166,074 in the 2020 census.

This region used to host a Taoist temple named Xuanfu Palace, which was constructed under the mandate of Hongzhi Emperor in 1504. After its completion in 1516, the temple served as a stopping point for Ming emperors on their way to hold memorial services for their ancestors. Since Chinese emperors were often referred to as Chinese dragons, the temple and the region surrounding it later earned the name of Huilongguan.

History

Administrative divisions 
As of the year 2021, Huilongguan Subdistrict consisted of 25 subdivisions, with 23 of them being communities, and the other 2 being villages:

Gallery

References

External links 

 Huilongguan Net (HLGnet)

Changping District
Subdistricts of Beijing